Albury Airport  is a regional airport located  northeast Albury, New South Wales, Australia. The airport, which also serves Albury's adjacent twin city of Wodonga, Victoria was the fifth busiest in New South Wales as of 2016-17 handling 257,769 passengers. However like most Australian airports, the impacts of travel restrictions and state border closures in response to the COVID-19 pandemic resulted in a significant reduction in revenue passengers. ABX handled 107,934 passengers in the 2021-22 Finacial Year and was the 32nd busiest airport in Australia. In addition to regular public transport flights, Albury airport handles a relatively large number of charter, freight, agricultural, and general aviation aircraft movements and hosts the official weather station for Albury-Wodonga.

History
Although the site had been laid out as an aerodrome since the late 1930s, it was not until 1963 that construction to allow regular passenger flights to Sydney and Melbourne was completed, with the first flights arriving on 16 December that year. The airport was officially opened by the Minister for National Development David Fairbairn on 13 September 1964.

The late 1970s and early 80s were a period of rapid growth at Albury airport, which benefited from expansion fuelled by the Albury-Wodonga National Growth Centre project. Upgrades to the runway were completed at this time to permit the operation of regional jet aircraft such as the Fokker F28 operated by East-West and Air NSW. A control tower and new terminal were completed in 1983  and passenger numbers almost doubled over the three years to 1986 (82,000 to 160,000). The main carriers serving Albury at this time included East-West, Air NSW and Kendell Airlines. The airport funded further expansion with funds from landing and departure fees, levied at $1.50 per passenger.

Kendell airlines remained a major operator serving Albury on behalf of Ansett Australia until 2002, flying to both Sydney and Melbourne. Virgin Blue launched Embraer 170 double-daily jet services from Sydney to Albury in February 2008. Further extensions to the passenger terminal to incorporate new security screening facilities were completed in 2009 at a cost of around $5 million. The Virgin E-jets would later be replaced on this route by 68-seat ATR-72s and were eventually withdrawn when successor Virgin Australia entered voluntary administration in 2020 and was restructured under new ownership. 

Brindabella Airlines provided a direct service to Canberra for a number of years from the mid 2000s, but this ended controversially in 2012 when the airline cited an expected increase in operating costs due to the implementation of the a carbon pricing scheme by set to be introduced by the Gillard Government. At the time of the cancellation, the route was reported to be performing poorly, averaging only six passengers per flight.

JETGO Australia introduced jet services to Brisbane in June 2016 using 36-seat Embraer ERJ-135LRs, expanding to two weekly return flights to the Gold Coast from 29 June 2017. JETGO Australia's services later ceased after the company entered voluntary administration on 1 June 2018.

Expansions to the arrivals hall, including a second baggage carousel and viewing area, departure lounge, cafe and bar were completed in September 2018. In February 2022, low-cost start-up airline Bonza announced that the airport would become one of its 17 launch destinations with twice weekly services between the Sunshine Coast and Albury using Boeing 737 MAX jets

Facilities
Due to a relatively high number of aircraft movements across all aviation activities, Albury Airport is one of the few regional airports in New South Wales to have an Air Traffic Control tower, which operates during daylight hours only. When the tower is closed, pilots are required to communicate via a Common Traffic Advisory Frequency (CTAF) to safely co-ordinate arrivals and departures. The airport has a single runway, 07/25, which measures . There is a VOR installation at the airport to assist pilots with radio navigation and instrument approach procedures, however despite being prone to low-visibility conditions, there is no Instrument landing system equipment available.

Airlines and destinations

The airport is serviced by QantasLink who uses a combination of 50 seat Dash 8-300s and 74 seat Dash 8-400s to Sydney and Melbourne; Rex Airlines who uses 36 seat Saab 340s on services to Sydney and formerly Melbourne.

Operations

See also 
 List of airports in New South Wales
 Transport in Australia

References

External links

 Albury Airport

Airports in New South Wales
Albury, New South Wales